AT-16 may refer to:

AT-16 Scallion, the NATO reporting name for the Russian build 9K121 Vikhr laser guided anti-tank missile
Noorduyn AT-16, a Canadian build version of the North American T-6 Texan trainer aircraft
USS Tillamook (AT-16), a United States Navy tug in service from 1914 to 1947